High Level is a town in northern Alberta, Canada. High Level is located within Mackenzie County and was founded in 1947. The town serves a trading area of approximately 20,000 people.

History 
The name High Level originated from the height of the land that separates the Peace and the Hay Rivers. The original High Level Sports Grounds were at this location and the old trail was still visible there in the mid 1960s. The High Level Golf & Country Club currently occupies this approximate location. For many years, High Level was known as Tloc Moi (Hay Meadow). The first fur traders arrived in this area in 1786, but it was not until 1947 that High Level was settled, with development of road access to Fort Vermilion being the primary factor in determining the town's present location. High Level's first power plant was established in 1957, and a year later the first post office was built. The oil fields were discovered in the 1960s, and the Mackenzie Northern Railway was run to the area in 1963.

Geography 
High Level marks the northern extent of the Peace River Country, and has one of the northernmost lands suited for agriculture in Canada. It is surrounded to the north and west by muskeg tundra.

Climate 

High Level has a subarctic climate (Köppen climate classification Dfc), with precipitation falling chiefly during the spring and summer, and wide temperature variations, rendering warm summers for the classification. The name notwithstanding, this town lies at a low elevation for an Alberta community and the regional topography contributes to the extremes of temperature. In winter, very cold air often pools over the area. In summer, air masses originating from higher elevations warm by compression as they descend to High Level. Summer temperatures render High Level well within the vegetation zone, and winter average temperatures are less severe than further east in Canada even on lower latitudes.

Fauna 
High Level has a variety of wildlife, including wolves, coyotes, ravens, and many types of insects. Hunters can find moose, deer, bear and geese. There are over 150 species of birds known to nest in the area.

Demographics 

In the 2016 Census of Population conducted by Statistics Canada, the Town of High Level recorded a population of 3,159 living in 1,096 of its 1,339 total private dwellings, a  change from its 2011 population of 3,641.

Economy 
The area surrounding High Level is known for its oil reserves and forests. Two large oil and gas fields, Rainbow Lake which is located west of the town and Zama City which is located North West of the town provides services to the oil patch. One OSB mill (which closed in 2007, and reopened in 2015 after the merger of Ainsworth and Norbord) is located south of High Level and a dimensional lumber mill is located in the town's industrial area.

High Level has the most northerly grain elevator in Canada and is a grain terminal for the large agricultural area.

Government 
The town has a council consisting of a mayor (Crystal McAteer) and six councillors (Brent Anderson, Robyn Dwyer, Terrance Jessiman, Joshua Lambert, Boyd Ernest Langford, Jan Welke).

Infrastructure 
Both airplane and helicopter services are available in High Level. Due to the 'remote' or northern location, medevac and chartered services, provided by Nor-Alta Aviation, Highland Helicopters and Delta Helicopters, are offered to serve the surrounding communities.

Scheduled airline service is offered by both Central Mountain Air and Northwestern Air; direct flights to Edmonton, Calgary, Lloydminster, Rainbow Lake, Hay River and Fort Smith are offered daily except Saturdays.

Telephone service is provided by the incumbent carrier Telus as well as Northwestel.

Regional businesses are represented by the High Level and District Chamber of Commerce.

Education 
High Level has three public schools and one private school.

High Level Public School was the first school built in High Level and had all grades, K-12, until Florence MacDougall Community School opened. It now goes from grade 7-12.
Spirit of the North Community School is the newest school in High Level and opened in 2000; it houses grades 4-6.
Florence MacDougall Community School goes from kindergarten through third grade.
High Level Christian Academy goes from kindergarten through grade 9, after which students transfer to High Level Public School.
According to the Fraser Institute, in 2016-17 High Level Public School was ranked 226 out of 262 schools.

Media 
The local radio station is CKHL-FM 102.1, part of the YL Country network of stations based at CKYL in Peace River. In addition, two radio services have repeaters: CBXL 99.5 FM, carrying CBC Radio One as a repeater of CBX Edmonton, and CFKX-FM 106.1, repeating CKKX-FM from Peace River. The local newspaper is The Echo.

Television is available by way of locally owned low-powered analogue repeaters of CITV-DT Edmonton (CH2807 channel 10) and CHAN-DT Vancouver (CH2808 channel 12), both owned by the High Level Community Hall Society.

The cable television system, in operation for 25 years as High Level Cable, was purchased in August 2006 by Northwestel Cable. Both analog and digital formats are available for television service. High-speed Internet service is also available from Northwestel.

See also 
List of communities in Alberta
List of towns in Alberta
High Level Airport
Tom Clancy's Endwar (Berkley Books 2008): High Level is the site of a major battle between American and Russian forces in this novel about World War III in which Russia invades Canada for the purpose of acquiring additional sources of oil.
High Level & District Chamber of Commerce

References

External links 

1965 establishments in Alberta
Towns in Alberta
Former new towns in Alberta